Kate Quinn is an American writer, known for her works of historical fiction.

Biography 
Quinn is a native of Southern California. She is based in San Diego. She graduated from Boston University with a master's degree in classical voice.

Quinn's 2017 historical fiction novel, The Alice Network, was a New York Times and USA Today bestseller. Her 2019 follow-up (and eighth novel), The Huntress, earned positive reviews in The Washington Post and Kirkus Reviews.

Books

The Empress of Rome Series
Mistress of Rome (2010) 
Daughters of Rome (2011) 
Empress of the Seven Hills (2012) 
The Three Fates (2015) ASIN B00TXRB1J0
Lady of the Eternal City (2015)

The Borgia Chronicles 
The Serpent and the Pearl (2013) 
The Lion and the Rose (2014)

Other novels
The Alice Network (2017) 
 The Huntress (2019) 
The Rose Code (2021) 
The Diamond Eye (2022)

Anthologies 

A Day of Fire: A Novel of Pompeii (2014) ISBN 978-0990324577
A Year of Ravens: A Novel of Boudica's Rebellion (2015) ISBN 978-1517635411 
A Song of War: A Novel of Troy (2016) ISBN 978-1536931853 
Ribbons of Scarlet: A Novel of the French Revolution's Women (2019) ISBN 978-0062952196

References 

Living people
21st-century American writers
American historical fiction writers
21st-century American women writers
Writers from California
Boston University alumni
Year of birth missing (living people)